Popular culture has served up portrayals of Neanderthals since the early 20th century. Early depictions conveyed and perpetuated notions of proverbially crude, low-browed cavemen; since the latter part of the 20th century, some depictions have modeled more sympathetic reconstructions of the genus Homo in the Middle Paleolithic era.
In popular idiom, people sometimes use the word "Neanderthal" as an insult - to suggest that a person so designated combines a deficiency in intelligence and a tendency to use brute force. The term may also imply that a person is old-fashioned or attached to outdated ideas, much in the same way as the terms "dinosaur" or "Yahoo".

A number of sympathetic literary portrayals of Neanderthals exist, as in the 1955 novel The Inheritors by William Golding, Isaac Asimov's 1958 short story "The Ugly Little Boy", or the more serious treatment by Finnish paleontologist Björn Kurtén (in several works including Dance of the Tiger (1978)) - compare British psychologist Stan Gooch's non-fiction works on the hybrid-origin theory of humans.

Origins

The contemporary perception of Neanderthals and their stereotypical portrayal has its origins in 19th century Europe. Naturalists and anthropologists were confronted with an increasing number of fossilized bones that did not match any known taxon. Carl Linnaeus' Systema Naturae of 1758 in which he had Homo sapiens introduced as a species without diagnosis and description, was the authoritative encyclopedia of the time. The notion of extinct species was unheard of and if so, would have contradicted the paradigm of the immutability of species and the physical world, which was the infallible product of a single and deliberate act of a creator god.
Most scholars simply declared the early Neanderthal fossils to be representatives of early "races" of modern man. Thomas Henry Huxley, a future supporter of Darwin's theory of evolution, saw in the Engis 2 fossil a "man of low degree of civilization". The discovery in the Neandertal he interpreted as to be within the range of variation of modern humans.

In mid 19th century Germany biological sciences were dominated by Rudolf Virchow, who described the bones as a "remarkable individual phenomenon" and as "plausible individual deformation". This statement is the reason why the characteristics of the Neanderthals were perceived as a form of pathological skeleton change of modern man in German-speaking countries for many years to come.

August Franz Josef Karl Mayer, an associate of Virchow emphasizes disease, prolonged pain and struggle on comparison with modern human features. "He confirmed the Neanderthal's rachitic changes in bone development[...]. Mayer argued among other things, that the thigh - and pelvic bones of Neanderthal man were shaped like those of someone who had spent all his life on horseback. The broken right arm of the individual had only healed very badly and the resulting permanent worry lines about the pain were the reason for the distinguished brow ridges. The skeleton was, he speculated, that of a mounted Russian Cossack, who had roamed the region in 1813/14 during the turmoils of the wars of liberation from Napoleon."

Arthur Keith of Britain and Marcellin Boule of France, were both senior members of their respective national paleontological institutes and among the most eminent paleoanthropologists of the early 20th century. Both men argued that this "primitive" Neanderthal could not be a direct ancestor of modern man. As a result, the museum's copy of the almost complete Neanderthal fossil of La Chapelle-aux-Saints was inaccurately mounted in an exaggerated crooked pose with a deformed and heavily curved spine and legs buckled. Boule commissioned the first illustrations of Neanderthal where he was characterized as a hairy gorilla-like figure with opposable toes, based on a skeleton that was already distorted with arthritis.

Portrayals in text

Novels (fiction)
* Edison Marshall's 1935 novel Dian of the Lost Land features Neanderthals and Cro-Magnons as traditional enemies surviving in a warm valley of Antarctica.
* Philip K. Dick's novel The Man Whose Teeth Were All Exactly Alike uses as a plot device the discovery of a Neanderthal skull in the United States. Neanderthals were also shown as living in primitive towns in the rural areas of the former United States in his book The Simulacra. At the later part of this book, the re-emerging Neanderthals (or "chuppers")  are happy at the outbreak of nuclear war, hoping that self-destruction of Homo sapiens might give them another opportunity to dominate Earth.
* In Mary Renault's The Bull from the Sea, the Kentaurs are portrayed as Neanderthals.
* Clifford D. Simak's 1968 novel The Goblin Reservation features a Neanderthal named Alley Oop (after the eponymous comic strip) brought into the future for study purposes. The novel features him approximately twenty years later. By then, he is educated enough to be working on a doctoral thesis, but still has trouble with certain social aspects, possessing, for example, a habit of breaking into closed stores when hungry and paying compensation later.
* Michael Crichton's 1976 novel Eaters of the Dead places a small Neanderthal population in Northern Europe as the source of the battles recorded in Beowulf. This story was also the basis for a motion picture The 13th Warrior (1999), though the word "Neanderthals" was never mentioned in the movie.
*Dance of the Tiger by professional paleontologist Björn Kurtén, follows interactions between European Homo sapiens and Neanderthals, possible worldviews and origins for troll mythology.
* The novel Glory Lane by Alan Dean Foster involves spacefaring Neanderthals who were removed from Earth by powerful aliens to save them from extinction.
* Colin Wilson discusses evidence and theories of Neanderthal survival into the modern age, including the possibility of their recent breeding with humans, in his book Unsolved Mysteries.
* The clash between the last of the Neanderthals and the emerging race of Homo sapiens is portrayed in A.A. Attanasio's 1991 novel Hunting the Ghost Dancer.
* Harry Turtledove's novella Down in the Bottomlands is set in an alternate timeline where the Mediterranean Sea has stayed dry since the Miocene, and Europe is still inhabited by Homo neanderthalensis, referred to in the story as "Strongbrows" and described as "shorter, stockier, fairer", than the "Highhead" people (presumably analogous to Homo sapiens).
* In John Darnton's 1996 novel Neanderthal, a group of surviving Neanderthals is discovered in the mountains of Afghanistan. In the novel, Neanderthals are said to possess the ability to read minds due to their larger cranial capacity, but unlike Cro-Magnons, lacked the capability of deception on more than two levels at a time. The author blamed the near-extinction of the Neanderthals on this shortcoming.
* Joan Dahr Lambert's novel Circles of Stone tells the story of a band of early Homo sapiens teaming up with a remnant band of Neanderthals to defeat a hostile band of H.sapiens who are trying to take over their territory. Set in the Pyrenees, Neanderthals are dying out because they cannot give birth to enough children; their infant heads are often too big.
* In The Silk Code by Paul Levinson (winner of 1999 Locus Award for Best First Novel), Neanderthals are still living in Basque country in 750 AD, and a few survive in the present world.
* In the novel Raising Abel, W. Michael Gear and Kathleen O'Neal Gear tell of Neanderthals cloned back into existence in modern times, who are the targets of assassination attempts by a Christian fundamentalist creationist sect.
* In Darwin's Radio by Greg Bear (winner of 2003 Nebula Award), a phenomenon which caused the Neanderthals to die off now threatens modern humans.
* Stephen Baxter's Manifold: Origin prominently features Neanderthals from an alternate timeline. This is a sequel to Manifold: Space where Neanderthal characters also appear, in a narrower context, as genetically engineered slave laborers.
* The novel Heaven by Ian Stewart and Jack Cohen features spacefaring Neanderthals who were removed from Earth by powerful aliens for unspecified reasons.
* In S. M. Stirling's novel The Sky People, Neanderthals inhabit an alternate-history Venus.
* In N-words by Ted Kosmatka, Neanderthals are resurrected by South Korean scientists en masse and intermarry with human.
* Stephen Baxter wrote The Lingering Joy, a sequel to Poul Anderson's "The Long Remembering" (see above). In a world on the brink of destruction in nuclear war, the daughter of the earlier story's protagonist embarks on the same kind of "mental time travel" as her father did many years before. Her main motivation is religious: to find out whether the Incarnation of Jesus was a single and unique event, or if God had before incarnated among the Neanderthals, to bring salvation to them, too.
 In Savage Eden by Nathan Martinez, the last living Neanderthal girl and a runaway autistic boy bond and learn to survive together as their hidden wilderness in the Caucasus Mountains is invaded by human death squads and armies on the eve of global nuclear war.
*In his Sigma Force novel The Bone Labyrinth, James Rollins describes the Watchers, a superior hybrid species of early humans and Neanderthals who disseminated knowledge and possibly interbred with people throughout the world. They also created the protected, hidden city of Atlantis, located in Ecuador.
 In 2017, The Last Neanderthal by Claire Cameron was published.
 In 2018, Jacques Gaubil published L'homme de Grand Soleil, a novel about the discovery of a Neanderthal living in the frigid northern Quebec and the chain of events that ensues, effectively a portrait of modern humans.

Short stories
* Neanderthals appear in H. G. Wells' 1921 short story "The Grisly Folk", which portrays them as savage and barbaric creatures who deserved their fate of extinction.
* L. Sprague de Camp's 1939 short story "The Gnarly Man" features an immortal Neanderthal living in the modern world.
* Poul Anderson's story "The Nest" is told from the point of view of a Neanderthal who finds himself in a peculiar time-traveling colony mixing people from various time periods and locations. He eventually has a crucial role in forging an alliance of people from very many different backgrounds, together fighting the story's villains - bandit adventurers from Medieval Norman Sicily aided by 20th-century Nazis. Eventually, he is able to return to his own time from which he was kidnapped, but finds Neanderthal society (his name for his kind is simply "The Men") too boring and settles on a career of time-traveling adventures along with a Russian woman he fell in love with.
* In Poul Anderson's "The Long Remembering", a modern man undertakes a "mental time travel" enabling him to experience the life of a very remote ancestor, a Cro-Magnon hunter setting out to rescue his mate who was kidnapped by the "Goblins" (Neanderthals) living across the river. The story makes the startling assumption that blond hair and blue eyes were Neanderthal characteristics (which would imply that modern humans having such hair and eyes have more of a Neanderthal ancestry than others). This is relevant to the plot: the woman, Evavi, is unique among  her tribe in being blond and blue-eyed, which makes other Cro-Magnon males suspicious of her. The protagonist, however, loves her and would have no other wife. Fearing that the Goblins may have eaten her, he ultimately finds that in fact they had treated her with respect and even a kind of reverence - since she looked like themselves but was much taller. In the course of rescuing her, the protagonist finds that the Goblins possess no fearsome magic power (as his people hitherto believed), that their weapons and fighting skills are much inferior to those of his people, and that their land is full of game animals - all of which lead him to contemplate a scheme of conquest. In 2014, Stephen Baxter wrote a sequel depicting the same setting generations later, when the process of Neanderthal extinction is far advanced.
* In the short story "The Ugly Little Boy" by Isaac Asimov, a Neanderthal child is brought into the present via time travel. Neanderthals are sympathetically depicted as having an articulate and sophisticated society and language, in conscious rebuttal of the above stereotype. In 1992 it was expanded into a novel in collaboration with Robert Silverberg, adding a convergent plot taking part in the Neanderthal society of the past.
* In Avram Davidson's story "The Ogre", some Neanderthals survived into historical times, the last of them coming to a tragic end in a remote valley of 16th-century Germany. The 20th-century archaeologist who discovered their traces came to an equally tragic end.
* In Wolves Beyond the Border - a Robert E. Howard fragment, part of the  Conan the Barbarian cycle. completed by L. Sprague de Camp - the fearsome Wizard of the Swamp lives in the Pictish Wilderness and has the ability to unleash demons against his enemies. The Wizard is said to be "not a Pict but the last remnant of an old race which lived in the land before the Picts overrun it" and the Wizard's description clearly identifies him as a Neanderthal.
* In Orson Scott Card's anthology Keeper of Dreams, the story "Heal Thyself" describes the accidental resurrection of Neanderthals during testing of an immune system enhancement.

Series
* In the Riverworld series, Philip José Farmer introduces a prominent Neanderthal character named Kazz (short from Kazzintuitruaabemss), who interacts with modern humans. His earlier novella "The Alley Man" concerns a Neanderthal whose family has survived into modern times.
* Neanderthals appear as characters in Jean M. Auel's Earth's Children series, including the 1986 movie adaptation of the first book, The Clan of the Cave Bear
*Neanderthals also appear in the 2005 Doctor Who New Series Adventures spin-off novel, Only Human, where they also show good intelligence but struggle with concepts such as fiction and lies, and they appear to not understand why humans "are always making things up".
* In William Shatner's Quest for Tomorrow series of novels, Neanderthals were a primitive psychic species which caught the eye of a large alien empire, which decided to isolate the telepathic gene and transplanted several experimental subjects to another world. The original Neanderthals were then eliminated so that no one else could reproduce the experiment. The Homo sapiens were not modified. The transplanted Neanderthals eventually evolved into an industrial society; this took much longer than it did for humanity, as a telepathic species would have problems inventing complex technology without the use of writing, which would be an unnecessary tool for telepaths. In the story, Neanderthals eventually joined and transcended their physical shape, becoming a god-like being.
* In Jasper Fforde's Thursday Next series of novels, Neanderthals are portrayed as having been brought back from extinction by cloning to act as medical test subjects thanks to their close relation to Homo sapiens but lack of legal status as human beings.
* Robert J. Sawyer's Neanderthal Parallax trilogy ("Hominids", "Humans", and "Hybrids") portrays contact with an alternate world where Neanderthals became the dominant species while Homo sapiens died out. The story begins with a neanderthal scientist being pulled into our world and dealing with the considerable culture shock - since by his moral standards, Homo sapiens are  terrible monsters. The first book in this series, Hominids, won the Hugo Award in 2003. (Sawyer's 1997 novel Frameshift used Neanderthal DNA as an element of a plot set in modern-day America.)

Comics and manga
* The DC Comics character Anthro is the first Cro-Magnon boy, born in the Stone Age to Neanderthal parents. His father, Neanderthal caveman Ne-Ahn is the chief of his tribe, his mother a captive member of another tribe. 

* In the Italian comic series Martin Mystère published by Bonelli Comics, sidekick of the protagonist is a Neanderthal called "Java".
* In the manga Seton Academy: Join the Pack! the character Anne Anetani initially pretends to be a modern human, but is eventually revealed to be a Neanderthal.

Film and television

Video games
Neanderthals appear as enemies in Titan Quest which is set in an Ancient World where mythology and legends are real. In contrast to their real-world extinction, the Neanderthals of Titan Quest continue to thrive in central Asia where they attack and plunder caravans along the Silk Road.
Neanderthals are among the primary factions in Far Cry: Primal. The game is set in an isolated valley around 10,000BC during the end of the Epipalaeolithic and beginning of the Mesolithic period in Europe. The game's Neanderthals are a remnant group that has survived long after other Neanderthals have gone extinct, though they too are afflicted by a disease and slowly dying out.

Politics
President Joe Biden condemned Texas Governor Greg Abbott (R) Mississippi Governor Tate Reeves (R) for ″Neanderthal thinking″ in ignoring health considerations in dropping mask mandates and removing other restrictions during the COVID-19 pandemic in the United States in March 2021.

See also
 Caveman
 Prehistoric fiction
 Sōsei no Taiga
 Dawn of Humanity (2015 PBS film)

References

External links
Apes a Man at The Encyclopedia of Science Fiction

 
Popular culture